Tephritis theryi is a species of tephritid or fruit flies in the genus Tephritis of the family Tephritidae.

Distribution
Morocco.

References

Tephritinae
Insects described in 1930
Diptera of Africa